The Party of Independents and Refugees was a political party in Greece in the 1920s.

History
The party first contested national elections in 1926, when they won two seats in the parliamentary elections with 1.8% of the national vote. However, the party did not contest any further elections.

References

Defunct political parties in Greece